Payton Derrick Hazzard (born 6 September 1993) is a Grenadian sprinter specialising in the 400 metres. He competed at the 2016 IAAF World Indoor Championships without advancing from the first round.

Although born in the United States, he chose to compete for Grenada, his parents' country of origin.

His personal bests in the event are 45.88 seconds outdoors (Tallahassee 2015) and 46.60 seconds indoors (Boston 2016).

Competition record

References

External links

1993 births
Living people
Grenadian male sprinters
Athletes (track and field) at the 2014 Commonwealth Games
Track and field athletes from New York City
Commonwealth Games competitors for Grenada